Protaetia fusca is a beetle belonging to the Cetoniinae subfamily.

Gallery

References

External links

Cetoniinae
Beetles described in 1790
Taxa named by Johann Friedrich Wilhelm Herbst